Pike County is a county located in the Appalachian (southern) region of the U.S. state of Ohio. As of the 2020 census, the population was 27,088. Its county seat is Waverly. The county is named for explorer Zebulon Pike.

History
Pike County was organized on February 1, 1815, from portions of Scioto, Ross, and Adams Counties, and was named in honor of Zebulon Pike, the explorer and soldier who had recently been killed in the War of 1812. Pike County was the site of the Pike County Massacre where eight members of the Rhoden family were shot and killed the evening of April 21–22, 2016.

Geography

Adjacent counties
 Ross County (north)
 Jackson County (east)
 Scioto County (south)
 Adams County (southwest)
 Highland County (west)

Demographics

2000 census
As of the census of 2000, there were 27,695 people, 10,444 households, and 7,665 families living in the county. The population density was 63 people per square mile (24/km2). There were 11,602 housing units at an average density of 26 per square mile (10/km2). The racial makeup of the county was 96.72% White, 0.89% Black or African American, 0.74% Native American, 0.18% Asian, 0.04% Pacific Islander, 0.07% from other races, and 1.36% from two or more races. 0.56% of the population were Hispanic or Latino of any race.

There were 10,444 households, out of which 35.50% had children under the age of 18 living with them, 56.80% were married couples living together, 11.90% had a female householder with no husband present, and 26.60% were non-families. 22.80% of all households were made up of individuals, and 10.40% had someone living alone who was 65 years of age or older. The average household size was 2.61 and the average family size was 3.04.

In the county, the population was spread out, with 27.20% under the age of 18, 8.90% from 18 to 24, 28.90% from 25 to 44, 21.50% from 45 to 64, and 13.60% who were 65 years of age or older. The median age was 35 years. For every 100 females there were 95.40 males. For every 100 females age 18 and over, there were 92.50 males.

The median income for a household in the county was $31,649, and the median income for a family was $35,934. Males had a median income of $32,379 versus $20,761 for females. The per capita income for the county was $16,093. About 15.10% of families and 18.60% of the population were below the poverty line, including 23.20% of those under age 18 and 13.60% of those age 65 or over.

2010 census
As of the 2010 United States Census, there were 28,709 people, 11,012 households, and 7,743 families living in the county. The racial makeup of the county was 96.6% white, 0.9% black or African American, 0.5% American Indian, 0.2% Asian, 0.2% from other races, and 1.6% from two or more races. Those of Hispanic or Latino origin made up 0.7% of the population. In terms of ancestry, 19.3% were German, 14.8% were Irish, 12.9% were English, and 12.5% were American.

Of the 11,012 households, 34.6% had children under the age of 18 living with them, 51.2% were married couples living together, 13.1% had a female householder with no husband present, 29.7% were non-families, and 25.1% of all households were made up of individuals. The average household size was 2.56 and the average family size was 3.02. The median age was 39.2 years.

The median income for a household in the county was $35,912 and the median income for a family was $43,010. Males had a median income of $40,645 versus $27,422 for females. The per capita income for the county was $17,494. About 18.0% of families and 23.6% of the population were below the poverty line, including 32.7% of those under age 18 and 15.2% of those age 65 or over.

Politics
Pike County used to be very strongly Democratic in presidential elections, being the only county in the state to vote for Adlai Stevenson in 1956. However, things have changed recently; Bill Clinton in 1996 was the last Democrat to win the county, though Barack Obama lost here by only one vote in 2012. In 2016, the county took a sharp turn to the right as Republican Donald Trump won over 65% of the vote in the county; he went on to win over 70% four years later.

|}

Government

The Garnet A. Wilson Public Library serves area communities from its main branch in Waverly, Ohio and from its branches in Beaver, Piketon, and Western Pike County.

In 2005, the library loaned more than 238,000 items to its 20,000 cardholders. Total holding are over 91,000 volumes with over 210 periodical subscriptions.

Pike County has adopted a county flag with an unusual shape, rounded at the fly end. It bears fourteen stars, representing the county's townships, and various industry symbols within a circular emblem, all upon a green field. The flag is through and through except for the emblem.

Communities

City
 Waverly (county seat)

Villages
 Beaver
 Piketon

Townships

 Beaver
 Benton
 Camp Creek
 Jackson
 Marion
 Mifflin
 Newton
 Pebble
 Pee Pee
 Perry
 Scioto
 Seal
 Sunfish
 Union

source:

Census-designated places
 Cynthiana
 Stockdale

Unincorporated communities
 Buchanan
 Camp
 Daleyville
 Idaho
 Jasper
 Latham
 Morgantown
 Omega
 Sargents
 Wakefield

See also
 National Register of Historic Places listings in Pike County, Ohio
 Pike County, Ohio, shootings

References

External links
 Pike County Visitors Bureau website
 Pike County Sheriff's Office

 
Appalachian Ohio
Counties of Appalachia
1815 establishments in Ohio
Populated places established in 1815